The Aminu Saleh College of Education is a state government higher education institution located in Azare, Bauchi State, Nigeria. It is affiliated to University of Maiduguri for its degree programmes. The current Provost is Abdullahi Mohammed Isyaku.

History 
The Aminu Saleh College of Education was established in 1977. It was established as Advanced Teachers’ College.

Courses 
The institution offers the following courses;

 Curriculum Studies
 Business Education
 Educational Foundations
 Home Economics
 Educational Psychology
 Technical Education
 Christian Religious Studies
 Physical And Health Education
 Islamic Studies
 Social Studies

Affiliation 
The institution is affiliated with the University of Maiduguri to offer programmes leading to Bachelor of Education, (B.Ed.) in;

 Biology
 English
 Arabic
 Islamic
 Economics
 Hausa
 Chemistry
 Physical Education
 Business Education
 Mathematics
 Physics
 Agriculture
 Health Education

References 

Universities and colleges in Nigeria
1977 establishments in Nigeria